Nisterud Station is a railway station serving Notodden, Norway, on the Bratsberg Line. The station has only one track and one platform, and is served with an hourly service to Grenland by Vy.

History
The station was opened in 1919, two years after Bratsberg Line. It was staffed until 1973. After the reorganization of the Bratsberg Line in 2004, Nisterud is the only station between Skien and Nordagutu that is served.

External links
 Jernbaneverket's page on Nisterud 

Railway stations on the Bratsberg Line
Railway stations in Notodden
Railway stations opened in 1919
1919 establishments in Norway